An archipelago is a landform which consists of a chain or cluster of islands.

It may also refer to:

In geography:
 Archipelago (Åland), a subdivision of Finland
 The Archipelago, a township in central Ontario, Canada
 Duchy of the Archipelago, a maritime state created in the Aegean Sea (the Cyclades) in the aftermath of the Fourth Crusade

In music:
 Archipelago (album), a live album by the American group, Land
 Archipelago, a 2012 album by Hidden Orchestra

In film
 Archipelago (2010 film), a 2010 British film by Joanna Hogg
 Archipelago (2021 film), a 2021 Canadian film by Félix Dufour-Laperrière

In literature
 Der Archipelagus ("The Archipelago"), a hymn written by Friedrich Hölderlin
 The Gulag Archipelago, a novel about the Soviet slave labor and concentration camp system by Aleksandr Solzhenitsyn
 Archipelago Books, a book publisher

In other fields:
 NYSE Arca,  an abbreviation of Archipelago Exchange, an online stock exchange owned by the NYSE Group
 Bismarck Archipelago Campaign, a military campaign from 15 December 1943 to 27 November 1944
 Archipelago Division, a Greek infantry formation active in 1916–1920
 Archipelago Philippine Ferries Corporation, a ferry company
 Archipelago Tomorrow, a local right-wing French political movement
 Archipelagos (video game), a 1989 video game for the Atari ST, Amiga and PC